Tilaiya is a village in the Chandwara CD block in the Koderma subdivision of the Koderma district in the Indian state of Jharkhand.

Geography

Location

Overview
Koderma district is plateau territory and around 60% of the total area is covered with forests. The first dam of the Damodar Valley Corporation, at Tilaiya, was built across the Barakar River and inaugurated in 1953. Koderma Junction railway station has emerged as an important railway centre in the region. It is a predominantly rural district with only 19.72% urban population.

Note: The map alongside presents some of the notable locations in the district. All places marked in the map are linked in the larger full screen map.

Tilaiya Dam
Tilaiya Dam was constructed by Damodar Valley Corporation across the Barakar River in 1953. The dam boasts of picturesque surroundings with a reservoir, which extends up to 36 km2. Tilaiya hydro power station is located on the left bank of the Barakar. The structure is entirely of reinforced concrete. It has 2 generating units of 2 MW each.

Demography
Kanti village, near Tilaiya Dam and located on the south side (or left bank) of the Barakar River, has a population, as per 2011 Census of India,  of 4,601 (males 2,785 and females 1,826). It is in Chandwara (community development block). A little further away is Barki Dhamrai with a population of 3,277 and Chotki Dhamrai with 1,290 people. Tilaia is a smaller village on the other side of Barakar River. It possibly lent its name to the dam.

Transport
While Tilaiya Dam is off the Patna-Ranchi highway (NH 31), the latter passes along the reservoir.

Education
Kailash Roy Saraswati Vidya Mandir, Jhumri Telaiya
Sainik School, Tilaiya

References

Villages in Koderma district